The fish crow (Corvus ossifragus) is a species of crow associated with wetland habitats in the eastern and southeastern United States.

Taxonomy and etymology 
The fish crow was given its binomial name by the Scottish ornithologist Alexander Wilson in 1812, in the fifth volume of his American Ornithology. The binomial is from Latin; Corvus means "raven", while ossifragus means "bone-breaker". It is derived from os or ossis, meaning "bone", and frangere, meaning "to break". The English-language common name fish crow also derives from Wilson, who ascribed the name to the crow's aquatic diet, as described to him by local fishermen. He distinguished the fish crow from John Bartram's great seaside crow by the former's diminutive size when compared to the American crow.

The fish crow's taxonomic relation to other species of the Corvus genus is still poorly understood, but DNA sequencing indicates that it is most closely related to the palm crow (C. palmarum) and the Jamaican crow (C. jamaicensis), with the three species forming a Nearctic clade. The Sinaloa crow (C. sinaloae) and Tamaulipas crow (C. imparatus) bear morphological similarities to and were once considered conspecific subspecies of the fish crow, but have since been recognized as distinct species.

Description

The fish crow is superficially similar to the American crow, but is smaller and has a silkier, smoother plumage by comparison. The upperparts have a blue or blue-green sheen, while the underparts have a more greenish tint to the black. The eyes are dark brown. The differences are often only really apparent between the two species when seen side by side or when heard calling. The bill is usually somewhat slimmer than the American crow, but is only readily distinguishable if both species are seen together.

Visual differentiation from the American crow is extremely difficult and often inaccurate. Nonetheless, differences apart from size do exist. Fish crows tend to have more slender bills and feet. There may also be a small sharp hook at the end of the upper bill. Fish crows also appear as if they have shorter legs when walking. More dramatically, when calling, fish crows tend to hunch and fluff their throat feathers.

The voice is the most outwardly differing characteristic for this species and other American crow species. The call of the fish crow has been described as a nasal "ark-ark-ark" or a begging "waw-waw". Birders often distinguish the two species (in areas where their range overlaps) with the mnemonic aid "Just ask him if he is an American crow. If he says "no", he is a fish crow." referring to the fact that the most common call of the American crow is a distinct "caw caw", while that of the fish crow is a nasal "nyuh unh". The fish crow also has a single call sounding like "cahrrr".

Distribution and habitat
This species occurs on the eastern seaboard of the United States from Rhode Island south to Key West, and west along the northern coastline of the Gulf of Mexico and follows many river systems inland for quite some distance. Coastal marshes and beaches, rivers, inland lakes and marshes, river banks, and the land immediately surrounding all are frequented.

Behavior

Diet

Food is taken mainly from the ground or shallow water where the bird hovers and plucks food items out of the water with its feet. The fish crow is omnivorous. It feeds on small crustaceans, such as crabs and shrimps, other invertebrates, stranded fish, and live fish if the situation favors their capture, eggs and nestlings of birds, small reptiles, the fruits of many trees, peanuts, and grains, as well as human scraps where available.

Breeding
The nest is usually built high in a tree and is often accompanied in nearby trees with other nests of the same species forming small, loose colonies. Usually, four or five eggs are laid. Pale blue-green in colour, they bear blotches of olive-brown. Fish crows build a new nest for each breeding attempt. A pair of fish crows were reported to have raised a young blue jay for multiple weeks.

Conservation
This species appears to be somewhat more resistant to West Nile virus than the American crow. Survival rates of up to 45% have been reported for fish crows, compared with near zero for American crows.

References

Further reading

External links

Differences between American and Fish Crows
Fish Crow videos from the Cornell Lab of Ornithology's Macaulay Library
Page from The Cornell Lab of Ornithology

Sound link
Fish crow call

Image link
 Fish crow series

fish crow
Native birds of the Southeastern United States
Endemic birds of the Eastern United States
fish crow
Taxa named by Alexander Wilson (ornithologist)